Acoela, or the acoels, is an order of small and simple invertebrates in the subphylum Acoelomorpha of phylum Xenacoelomorpha, a deep branching bilaterian group of animals, which resemble flatworms. Historically they were treated as an order of turbellarian flatworms.

This refers to the fact that acoels have a structure lacking a fluid-filled body cavity.

Description 
They are bilaterally symmetric and microscopic.

They are found worldwide in marine and brackish waters, usually having a benthic lifestyle, although some species are epibionts. Two species, Limonoposthia polonica and Oligochoerus limnophilus, lives in freshwater.

Members of the class Acoela lack a conventional gut, so that the mouth opens directly into the mesenchyme, i.e., the layer of tissue that fills the body. Digestion is accomplished by means of a syncytium that forms a vacuole around ingested food. There are no epithelial cells lining the digestive vacuole, but there is sometimes a short pharynx leading from the mouth to the vacuole. All other bilateral animals (apart from tapeworms) have a gut lined with epithelial cells. As a result, the acoels appear to be solid-bodied.

As the basal lineage of bilateral animals, the Acoela provide interesting insights into early animal evolution and development. The most thoroughly studied animal in this group is the species Isodiametra pulchra. Acoela used to be classified in the phylum Platyhelminthes. However, Acoela was separated from this phylum after molecular analyses showed that it had diverged before the three main bilaterian clades had formed.

Taxonomy
The following sub-taxa are recognised in the order Acoela:

 Family Actinoposthiidae Hooge, 2001
 Family Antigonariidae Dörjes, 1968
 Family Antroposthiidae Faubel, 1976
 Family Diopisthoporidae Westblad, 1940
 Family Nadinidae Dörjes, 1968 
 Family Paratomellidae Dörjes, 1966
 Family Taurididae Kostenko, 1989
 Suborder Bursalia Jondelius et al., 2011
 Infraorder Crucimusculata Jondelius et al., 2011
 Family Dakuidae Hooge, 2003
 Family Isodiametridae Hooge & Tyler, 2005
 Family Otocelididae Westblad, 1948
 Family Proporidae Graff, 1882 
 Superfamily Aberrantospermata Jondelius et al., 2011
 Family Convolutidae Graff, 1905
 Family Mecynostomidae Dörjes, 1968
 Infraorder Prosopharyngida Jondelius et al., 2011
 Family Hallangiidae Westblad, 1946
 Family Hofsteniidae Bock, 1923
 Family Solenofilomorphidae Dörjes, 1968

References

Acoelomorphs